The 20th parallel south is a circle of latitude that is 20 degrees south of the Earth's equatorial plane. It crosses the Atlantic Ocean, Africa, the Indian Ocean, Australasia, the Pacific Ocean and South America.

Around the world
Starting at the Prime Meridian and heading eastwards, the parallel 20° south passes through:

See also
19th parallel south
21st parallel south

s20